The 2020–21 season was Paksi FC's 15th competitive season, 15th consecutive season in the OTP Bank Liga and 68th year in existence as a football club.

Transfers

Summer

In:

Out:

Source:

Winter

In:

Out:

Source:

Nemzeti Bajnokság I

League table

Results summary

Results by round

Matches

Hungarian Cup

Statistics

Appearances and goals
Last updated on 9 May 2021.

|-
|colspan="14"|Youth players:

|-
|colspan="14"|Out to loan:

|-
|colspan="14"|Players no longer at the club:

|}

Top scorers
Includes all competitive matches. The list is sorted by shirt number when total goals are equal.
Last updated on 9 May 2021

Disciplinary record
Includes all competitive matches. Players with 1 card or more included only.

Last updated on 9 May 2021

Overall
{|class="wikitable"
|-
|Games played || 37 (33 OTP Bank Liga and 4 Hungarian Cup)
|-
|Games won || 17 (14 OTP Bank Liga and 3 Hungarian Cup)
|-
|Games drawn || 8 (8 OTP Bank Liga and 0 Hungarian Cup)
|-
|Games lost || 12 (11 OTP Bank Liga and 1 Hungarian Cup)
|-
|Goals scored || 86
|-
|Goals conceded || 72
|-
|Goal difference || +14
|-
|Yellow cards || 80
|-
|Red cards || 3
|-
|rowspan="1"|Worst discipline ||  Bence Lenzsér (11 , 0 )
|-
|rowspan="1"|Best result || 9–2 (A) v Budafok - Nemzeti Bajnokság I - 25-04-2021
|-
|rowspan="1"|Worst result || 0–5 (A) v Ferencváros - Nemzeti Bajnokság I - 11-09-2020
|-
|rowspan="1"|Most appearances ||  Máté Sajbán (34 appearances)
|-
|rowspan="1"|Top scorer ||  János Hahn (24 goals)
|-
|Points || 60/111 (54.05%)
|-

References

External links
 Official Website
 UEFA
 fixtures and results

Hungarian football clubs 2020–21 season
Paksi SE seasons